Schmalkalden-Meiningen I is an electoral constituency (German: Wahlkreis) represented in the Landtag of Thuringia. It elects one member via first-past-the-post voting. Under the current constituency numbering system, it is designated as constituency 12. It covers the southern part of Schmalkalden-Meiningen.

Schmalkalden-Meiningen I was created for the 1994 state election. Since 1999, it has been represented by Michael Heym of the Christian Democratic Union (CDU).

Geography
As of the 2019 state election, Schmalkalden-Meiningen I covers the southern part of Schmalkalden-Meiningen, specifically the municipalities of Belrieth, Birx, Christes, Dillstädt, Einhausen, Ellingshausen, Erbenhausen, Frankenheim/Rhön, Friedelshausen, Grabfeld (only Wölfershausen), Kaltennordheim (only Aschenhausen, Kaltensundheim, Kaltenwestheim, Melpers, Mittelsdorf, Oberkatz und Unterweid), Kühndorf, Leutersdorf, Mehmels, Meiningen, Neubrunn, Obermaßfeld-Grimmenthal, Oberweid, Rhönblick, Rippershausen, Ritschenhausen, Rohr, Schwallungen, Schwarza, Stepfershausen, Sülzfeld, Untermaßfeld, Utendorf, Vachdorf, Wasungen, and Zella-Mehlis (only Benshausen).

Members
The constituency has been held by the Christian Democratic Union since its creation in 1994. Its first representative was Adalbert Bauch, who served from 1994 to 1999. Since 1999, it has been represented by Michael Heym.

Election results

2019 election

2014 election

2009 election

2004 election

1999 election

1994 election

Notes

References

Electoral districts in Thuringia
1994 establishments in Germany
Schmalkalden-Meiningen
Constituencies established in 1994